Chamaesphecia hungarica, the Hungarian clearwing moth, is a moth of the family Sesiidae. It is native to the south-eastern Czech Republic and Slovakia, Austria, Hungary, Serbia and Croatia. It was originally approved for introduction into the United States in 1993. It has been released at several leafy spurge-infested sites in Montana and North Dakota.

Adults are 10–14 mm in length. They are dark brown with yellow markings. The wings are mostly clear, with dark margins and brown and yellow markings. In Europe it is usually found in moist loamy soils and partial shade near riverbanks, swampy areas and ditches. Here, adults emerge from mid May to late July.

The larvae feed on plants in the subgenus Esula of the genus Euphorbia. The larvae mine the stem and move into the pith area. They overwinter in the roots and migrate to the stem base in spring where pupation occurs.

References

Moths described in 1901
Sesiidae
Moths of Europe